Paul N. Symens (born July 15, 1943) is an American former politician. He served in the South Dakota Senate from 1987 to 1994 and from 1997 to 2004.

References

1943 births
Living people
Farmers from South Dakota
People from Marshall County, South Dakota
Democratic Party members of the South Dakota House of Representatives
Democratic Party South Dakota state senators